Woodend is a rural suburb of the New Zealand city of Invercargill.

Demographics

It had a population of 174 at the 2018 New Zealand census, an increase of 12 people (7.4%) since the 2013 census, and an increase of 3 people (1.8%) since the 2006 census. There were 69 households. There were 90 males and 81 females, giving a sex ratio of 1.11 males per female. The median age was 40.9 years (compared with 37.4 years nationally), with 39 people (22.4%) aged under 15 years, 21 (12.1%) aged 15 to 29, 87 (50.0%) aged 30 to 64, and 24 (13.8%) aged 65 or older.

Ethnicities were 93.1% European/Pākehā, 12.1% Māori, 1.7% Asian, and 1.7% other ethnicities (totals add to more than 100% since people could identify with multiple ethnicities).

Although some people objected to giving their religion, 60.3% had no religion, 29.3% were Christian and 1.7% had other religions.

Of those at least 15 years old, 15 (11.1%) people had a bachelor or higher degree, and 54 (40.0%) people had no formal qualifications. The median income was $30,300, compared with $31,800 nationally. The employment status of those at least 15 was that 66 (48.9%) people were employed full-time, and 27 (20.0%) were part-time.

Woodend-Greenhills statistical area
Woodend-Greenhills also includes Tiwai Point and Omaui, and surrounds but does not include Bluff.

Woodend-Greenhills had a population of 597 at the 2018 New Zealand census, a decrease of 6 people (−1.0%) since the 2013 census, and a decrease of 15 people (−2.5%) since the 2006 census. There were 246 households. There were 306 males and 291 females, giving a sex ratio of 1.05 males per female. The median age was 43.5 years (compared with 37.4 years nationally), with 117 people (19.6%) aged under 15 years, 81 (13.6%) aged 15 to 29, 306 (51.3%) aged 30 to 64, and 96 (16.1%) aged 65 or older.

Ethnicities were 87.4% European/Pākehā, 15.6% Māori, 1.5% Pacific peoples, 6.0% Asian, and 2.5% other ethnicities (totals add to more than 100% since people could identify with multiple ethnicities).

The proportion of people born overseas was 13.1%, compared with 27.1% nationally.

Although some people objected to giving their religion, 52.8% had no religion, 33.2% were Christian, 0.5% were Hindu and 2.0% had other religions.

Of those at least 15 years old, 60 (12.5%) people had a bachelor or higher degree, and 147 (30.6%) people had no formal qualifications. The median income was $32,600, compared with $31,800 nationally. 51 people (10.6%) earned over $70,000 compared to 17.2% nationally. The employment status of those at least 15 was that 261 (54.4%) people were employed full-time, 81 (16.9%) were part-time, and 6 (1.2%) were unemployed.

References

Suburbs of Invercargill